Catuna is an Afrotropical genus of brush-footed butterflies.

Species
Catuna angustatum (C. & R. Felder, [1867])
Catuna crithea (Drury, [1773])
Catuna niji Fox, 1965
Catuna oberthueri Karsch, 1894
Catuna sikorana Rogenhofer, 1889

References

Seitz, A. Die Gross-Schmetterlinge der Erde 13: Die Afrikanischen Tagfalter. Plate XIII 46

Limenitidinae
Nymphalidae genera
Taxa named by William Forsell Kirby